Kausalya is the senior queen-consort of Kosala in the Hindu epic Ramayana. She is the mother of Rama, the titular hero of the epic, and the senior wife of Dasharatha, who ruled Kosala from its capital of Ayodhya.  

In some later accounts, Shanta is described as her daughter, and the eldest child, of Dasharatha. However, in the Bala Kanda of the Ramayana, Valmiki writes of Shanta only as the daughter of Romapada, the king of Anga, who was a friend of Dasharatha. At no point is Shanta's mother named.

Legend

Valmiki does not mention the names of Kausalya's parents, but in the 'Ayodhya Kanda' she is described as Kosalendraduhitā (daughter of the king of Kosala). 

Later texts name her as the daughter of the King Sukaushala and Queen Amritaprabha of Dakshina Kosala. At her traditionally ascribed birthplace, there exists a temple dedicated to her called the Mata Kaushalya Temple, which is perhaps among the few temples dedicated to her. 

At the sacrifice performed by Rishyasringa so that Dasharatha might bear sons, a divine being presented the king with a golden bowl filled with a payasam (a milk delicacy) prepared by the gods. Dasharatha offered half of this divine food to Kausalya, a quarter to Sumitra (literally 'half of that which remained'), an eighth to Kaikeyi (again 'half of that which remained'), and then, upon reflection, gave the final eighth to Sumitra again.

When Rama set forth to begin his exile from Ayodhya, Dasaratha, and Kausalya hurried after his chariot until Rama, unable to bear the sight, told his charioteer Sumantra to quicken his pace so that they would be left behind.  

She ceased to be primary queen consort of Kosala with the death of her husband. She exercised the title of queen dowager until her son's accession to the throne, upon which she was widely honoured as the queen mother.         

Queen Kausalya is considered to be the incarnation of Dhara (Brahmani), wife of Dronavasu. She received a boon from Vishnu, who promised her that he would be born as her son in the Treta Yuga.

Worship 
The Mata Kaushalya Temple is located in Chandkhuri in the Raipur District of Chhattisgarh. The temple has been revived and inaugurated by the Chief Minister of Chhattisgarh, Bhupesh Baghel, and other dignitaries, under the 'Ram Van Gaman Path' project in October 2021.

See also

Kaikeyi
Sumitra
Versini

References

External links

Solar dynasty
People from Kosala
Characters in the Ramayana